The meridian 86° west of Greenwich is a line of longitude that extends from the North Pole across the Arctic Ocean, North America, the Gulf of Mexico, the Caribbean Sea, Central America, the Pacific Ocean, the Southern Ocean, and Antarctica to the South Pole.

The 86th meridian west forms a great circle with the 94th meridian east.

From Pole to Pole
Starting at the North Pole and heading south to the South Pole, the 86th meridian west passes through:

{| class="wikitable plainrowheaders"
! scope="col" width="120" | Co-ordinates
! scope="col" | Country, territory or sea
! scope="col" | Notes
|-
| style="background:#b0e0e6;" | 
! scope="row" style="background:#b0e0e6;" | Arctic Ocean
| style="background:#b0e0e6;" |
|-valign="top"
| 
! scope="row" | 
| Nunavut — Ellesmere Island, Axel Heiberg Island, Stor Island and Ellesmere Island again
|-
| style="background:#b0e0e6;" | 
! scope="row" style="background:#b0e0e6;" | Jones Sound
| style="background:#b0e0e6;" |
|-
| 
! scope="row" | 
| Nunavut — Devon Island
|-
| style="background:#b0e0e6;" | 
! scope="row" style="background:#b0e0e6;" | Lancaster Sound
| style="background:#b0e0e6;" |
|-
| 
! scope="row" | 
| Nunavut — Baffin Island
|-
| style="background:#b0e0e6;" | 
! scope="row" style="background:#b0e0e6;" | Admiralty Inlet
| style="background:#b0e0e6;" |
|-
| 
! scope="row" | 
| Nunavut — Yeoman Island
|-
| style="background:#b0e0e6;" | 
! scope="row" style="background:#b0e0e6;" | Admiralty Inlet
| style="background:#b0e0e6;" |
|-
| 
! scope="row" | 
| Nunavut —  Baffin Island
|-
| style="background:#b0e0e6;" | 
! scope="row" style="background:#b0e0e6;" | Gulf of Boothia
| style="background:#b0e0e6;" |
|-
| 
! scope="row" | 
| Nunavut — Melville Peninsula (mainland)
|-
| style="background:#b0e0e6;" | 
! scope="row" style="background:#b0e0e6;" | Roes Welcome Sound
| style="background:#b0e0e6;" |
|-
| 
! scope="row" | 
| Nunavut — Southampton Island
|-
| style="background:#b0e0e6;" | 
! scope="row" style="background:#b0e0e6;" | Hudson Bay
| style="background:#b0e0e6;" |
|-
| 
! scope="row" | 
| Ontario
|-valign="top"
| style="background:#b0e0e6;" | 
! scope="row" style="background:#b0e0e6;" | Lake Superior
| style="background:#b0e0e6;" | Passing just west of Michipicoten Island, Ontario,  (at )
|-
| 
! scope="row" | 
| Michigan
|-
| style="background:#b0e0e6;" | 
! scope="row" style="background:#b0e0e6;" | Lake Michigan
| style="background:#b0e0e6;" |
|-valign="top"
| 
! scope="row" | 
| Michigan — North Manitou Island and mainland Indiana — from  Kentucky — from  Tennessee — from  Alabama — from  Florida — from 
|-
| style="background:#b0e0e6;" | 
! scope="row" style="background:#b0e0e6;" | Gulf of Mexico
| style="background:#b0e0e6;" |
|-valign="top"
| style="background:#b0e0e6;" | 
! scope="row" style="background:#b0e0e6;" | Caribbean Sea
| style="background:#b0e0e6;" | Passing between the islands of Roatán (at ) and Guanaja (at ), 
|-
| 
! scope="row" | 
|
|-
| 
! scope="row" | 
|
|-
| style="background:#b0e0e6;" | 
! scope="row" style="background:#b0e0e6;" | Pacific Ocean
|-
| style="background:#b0e0e6;" | 
! scope="row" style="background:#b0e0e6;" | Southern Ocean
| style="background:#b0e0e6;" |
|-
| 
! scope="row" | Antarctica
|-
|}

See also
85th meridian west
87th meridian west

w086 meridian west